Group B of the 2000 Fed Cup Europe/Africa Zone Group I was one of four pools in the Europe/Africa Zone Group I of the 2000 Fed Cup. Four teams competed in a round robin competition, with the top team advancing to the knockout stage.

Hungary vs. Latvia

South Africa vs. Greece

Hungary vs. Greece

South Africa vs. Latvia

Hungary vs. South Africa

Greece vs. Latvia

  failed to win any ties in the pool, and thus was relegated to Group II in 2001, where they placed second in their pool of four.

See also
Fed Cup structure

References

External links
 Fed Cup website

2000 Fed Cup Europe/Africa Zone